The Ajax mine is one of the largest molybdenum mines in Canada. The mine is located in western Canada in British Columbia. The Ajax mine has reserves amounting to 552.1 million tonnes of molybdenum ore grading 0.061% molybdenum, thus resulting in 337,000 tonnes of molybdenum.

See also
List of molybdenum mines

References 

Molybdenum mines in Canada